Craft Glacier is a valley glacier about  long, lying west of Hendersin Knob on Thurston Island and flowing south to Abbot Ice Shelf in Peacock Sound. It was first delineated from air photos taken by U.S. Navy Operation HIGHJUMP in December 1946, and named by the Advisory Committee on Antarctic Names for Ensign Charles Craft, U.S. Navy, a helicopter pilot on USS Glacier who made exploratory flights at Thurston Island in February 1960.

See also
 List of glaciers in the Antarctic
 Glaciology

Maps
 Thurston Island – Jones Mountains. 1:500000 Antarctica Sketch Map. US Geological Survey, 1967.
 Antarctic Digital Database (ADD). Scale 1:250000 topographic map of Antarctica. Scientific Committee on Antarctic Research (SCAR), 1993–2016.

References 

 

Glaciers of Thurston Island